Code page 867 (CCSID 867) is a Hebrew 8-bit code page defined by IBM in 1998. It is based on Code page 862 but replaces several characters not used in Hebrew with nonprinting characters for bidirectional text support, a euro sign and a shekel sign.

The code page ID is conflictive with a NEC code page for the Kamenický encoding defined since 1992.

Character set

References

867